Purvaičiai (formerly ) is a village in Kėdainiai district municipality, in Kaunas County, in central Lithuania. According to the 2011 census, the village was uninhabited.

There were Purvaičiai estate and homestead before the Soviet era.

Demography

References

Villages in Kaunas County
Kėdainiai District Municipality